3067 Akhmatova, provisional designation , is a stony Flora asteroid from the inner regions of the asteroid belt, approximately 6 kilometers in diameter.

The asteroid discovered on 14 October 1982, by Soviet–Russian astronomers Lyudmila Zhuravleva and Lyudmila Karachkina at the Crimean Astrophysical Observatory, Nauchnyj, on the Crimean peninsula. It was named after Russian poet Anna Akhmatova.

Orbit and classification 

Akhmatova is a S-type asteroid and a member of the Flora family, one of the largest groups of stony asteroids in the main-belt. It orbits the Sun in the inner main-belt at a distance of 1.9–2.6 AU once every 3 years and 4 months (1,229 days). Its orbit has an eccentricity of 0.14 and an inclination of 5° with respect to the ecliptic.

Physical characteristics

Diameter and albedo 

According to the survey carried out by the NEOWISE mission of NASA's space-based Wide-field Infrared Survey Explorer, Akhmatova measures 6.3 and 6.5 kilometers in diameter and its surface has an albedo of 0.269 and 0.285, respectively, while the Collaborative Asteroid Lightcurve Link assumes an albedo of 0.24 – which derives from 8 Flora, the largest member and namesake of this orbital family – and calculates a diameter of 6.8 kilometers with an absolute magnitude of 13.0.

Rotation period 

In December 2009, and May 2012, two rotational lightcurves of Akhmatova were obtained from photometric observations by Czech astronomer Petr Pravec. Observations at the Palomar Transient Factory in August 2012, gave a period of  hours and an amplitude of 0.40 in magnitude.

Naming 

This minor planet was named after Russian modernist poet, Anna Akhmatova (1889–1966), awarded an honorary doctorate by Oxford University. The official naming citation was published by the Minor Planet Center on 31 May 1988.

Notes

References

External links 
 Asteroid Lightcurve Database (LCDB), query form (info )
 Dictionary of Minor Planet Names, Google books
 Asteroids and comets rotation curves, CdR – Observatoire de Genève, Raoul Behrend
 Discovery Circumstances: Numbered Minor Planets (1)-(5000) – Minor Planet Center
 
 

003067
Discoveries by Lyudmila Zhuravleva
Discoveries by Lyudmila Karachkina
Named minor planets
19821014
Anna Akhmatova